This is list of scholarly, missionary and other works by Robert Morrison (missionary):

Resources
 Works by Morrison, Robert, 1782-1834 - scans on Internet Archive
 Andrew West, The Morrison Collection: Bibliography of Robert Morrison

History of Christianity in China